Jaime Ríos (born 31 October 1977) is a Spanish rower. He competed in the men's double sculls event at the 2000 Summer Olympics.

References

External links
 

1977 births
Living people
Spanish male rowers
Olympic rowers of Spain
Rowers at the 2000 Summer Olympics
People from Avilés